Rya Kihlstedt is an American actress. She starred in the 1997 comedy film Home Alone 3 as Alice Ribbons. The following years she appeared in films Deep Impact (1998), Women in Trouble (2009) and The Atticus Institute (2015). On television, she had a recurring roles as Dr. Michelle Ross in the Showtime crime drama Dexter and as Marilyn Rhodes in the ABC musical drama Nashville. In 2015, she starred in the NBC miniseries Heroes Reborn.

Early life
Kihlstedt was born in Lancaster, Pennsylvania and is a 1991 graduate of Skidmore College in Theatre Arts. She is of Nicaraguan descent.

Career
Kihlstedt made her film debut starring opposite Rutger Hauer in the 1993 action thriller film Arctic Blue. In 1995, she appeared in the ABC miniseries Heaven & Hell: North & South, Book III and in 1995 played Lizzie Elmsworth in the BBC adaptation of Edith Wharton's last novel, The Buccaneers. In 1997, she starred as Alice Ribbons, one of the criminals in the family comedy film Home Alone 3. The following year, she appeared in the  science-fiction film Deep Impact, and co-starred opposite Carla Gugino in the independent film Jaded. Also in 1998, Kihlstedt starred with Peter Gallagher in the television film Brave New World loosely based on Aldous Huxley's 1932 novel of the same name.

Kihlstedt took a ten-year break from acting as she focused on motherhood and raising her two children. In 2009, she returned to screen appearing opposite her friend Carla Gugino in the comedy film Women in Trouble, and its sequel, Elektra Luxx. She guest-starred in a number of television series, including Covert Affairs, Criminal Minds, NCIS, CSI: Crime Scene Investigation, and Drop Dead Diva. In 2011, she had a recurring role in the Showtime crime drama series Dexter as Dr. Michelle Ross. From 2012 to 2013, she played Marilyn Rhodes, a powerful record producer in the ABC musical drama Nashville. Also in 2013, she starred in the comedy film 3 Days in Havana directed by her husband Gil Bellows.

In 2015, Kihlstedt played the leading role in the independent horror film The Atticus Institute. From 2015 to 2016, she starred as Erica Kravid in the NBC science fiction miniseries Heroes Reborn. Also in 2015, she was cast as Tig Notaro's mother Caroline in the Amazon Video original comedy series One Mississippi. Kihlstedt later appeared in Once Upon a Time, Ray Donovan, Agents of S.H.I.E.L.D. and NBC 2017 miniseries Law & Order True Crime. From 2018 to 2019, she had a recurring role as Julia Wagner in the CW series Charmed. In 2019, she had a recurring role opposite Carla Gugino in her series Jett, and played Kate Laswell in the video game Call of Duty: Modern Warfare. Also in 2019, she starred in the season three of the Canadian crime drama Cardinal, for which she received Canadian Screen Award nomination.

In 2020, she starred in the Hulu limited series, A Teacher.

In 2022, Khilstedt recurred in Superman & Lois as Ally Allston.

Personal life
In 1994, Kihlstedt married actor Gil Bellows. They have two children, a daughter and a son. She is the sister of Oakland-based violinist Carla Kihlstedt, who has been a member of bands such as Charming Hostess, Sleepytime Gorilla Museum, and Tin Hat.

Filmography

Film

Television

Video Game

References

External links

Living people
20th-century American actresses
21st-century American actresses
Actors from Lancaster, Pennsylvania
Actresses from Pennsylvania
American film actresses
American people of Swedish descent
American stage actresses
American television actresses
Lancaster Country Day School alumni
Skidmore College alumni
Year of birth missing (living people)